
Year 875 (DCCCLXXV) was a common year starting on Saturday (link will display the full calendar) of the Julian calendar.

Events 
 By place 

 Europe 
 August 12 – Emperor Louis II dies in Brescia, after having named his cousin Carloman, son of King Louis the German, as his successor. Louis is buried in the Basilica of Sant'Ambrogio in Milan.
 December 29 – King Charles the Bald, supported by Pope John VIII, travels to Italy. He receives the Imperial Regalia at Pavia, and is crowned Holy Roman Emperor as Charles II at Rome.
 Louis the Stammerer, son of Charles the Bald, marries for the second time Adelaide of Paris, after divorcing Ansgarde of Burgundy, with whom he is secretly married. 
 King Harald Fairhair of Norway subdues the rovers on the Orkney Islands and Shetland Islands, and adds them to his kingdom (approximate date).

 Britain 
 June – The Great Heathen Army, led by Guthrum, moves on Cambridge. He later returns to Wessex, to establish a winter quarter. King Alfred the Great fights the Danes in a naval engagement.
 Battle of Dollar: Invading Danish Vikings defeat the Scots and the Picts, under King Constantine I, at Dollar. They occupy Caithness, Sutherland, Ross and Moray, far to the north.
 Danish Vikings, probably led by Halfdan Ragnarsson, invade Dublin. During the fighting, Eystein Olafsson, king of Dublin, is killed.
 Donyarth, the last recorded king of Cornwall, drowns in what is thought to be the River Fowey.

 Arabian Empire 
 Fall – An Arab fleet from Taranto sails up the Adriatic Sea and sacks Comacchio, putting it to flames. They attack Grado (bishopric of the Venetian Republic), but are repelled by the Venetians.
 Muhammad II, emir of the Aghlabids, dies and is succeeded by his brother Ibrahim II. Towards the end of his reign, a caravan of pilgrims from Mecca introduces the plague in Ifriqiya (Tunisia). 
 The Samanid Dynasty establishes a court at Bukhara (modern Uzbekistan), which becomes a rival city to Baghdad on the strategic Silk Road.

 Asia 
 King Jayavarman III founds a new dynasty at Indrapura (Quảng Nam) in Champa, in the central region of modern-day Vietnam. He initiates a building program in the Dong Duong Style.

 By topic 
 Religion 
 The construction of the Great Mosque of Kairouan is completed by Ibrahim II. He builds another three bays, reducing the size of the courtyard. 
 Bretons begin to flee the land, seeking the relative security of Britain. Vikings loot the Abbey of Saint-Melaine at Rennes (approximate date).

Births 
 March 22 – William I, duke of Aquitaine (d. 918)
 Adalbert II, Frankish margrave (approximate date)
 Ermentrude, Frankish princess, daughter of Louis the Stammerer (or 878)
 Fruela II, king of Asturias and León (approximate date)
 Fujiwara no Nakahira, Japanese statesman (d. 945)
 Gerhard I, Frankish nobleman (approximate date)
 Lady Ise, Japanese poet (approximate date)
 Mary the Younger, Byzantine saint (d. 902)
 Sale Ngahkwe, king of Burma (approximate date) 
 Spytihněv I, duke of Bohemia (approximate date)
 Sueiro Belfaguer, Portuguese nobleman (d. 925)

Deaths 
 August 12 – Louis II, king of Italy and Holy Roman Emperor (b. 825)
 October 28 – Remigius of Lyon, Frankish archbishop
 November 11 – Teutberga, queen of Lotharingia
 'Abdallah ibn Muhammad ibn Yazdad al-Marwazi, Persian official
 Amram Gaon, Jewish liturgist (approximate date)
 Donyarth, king of Cornwall (approximate date)
 Gyeongmun, king of Silla (Korea) (b. 841)
 Eystein Olafsson, Norse–Gael king of Dublin
 Martianus Hiberniensis, Irish monk and calligrapher (b. 819)
 Muhammad II, emir of the Aghlabids
 Muslim ibn al-Hajjaj, Persian scholar 
 Xiao Fang, chancellor of the Tang Dynasty (b. 796)

References